Drosophila albipalpis is a species of fly in the subgenus Dudaica.

References 

albipalpis
Insects described in 2018